Utyakovo (Ütäk) is a rural locality (a selo) and the administrative centre of Utyakovsky Selsoviet, Gafuriysky District, Bashkortostan, Russia. The population was 567 as of 2010. There are 12 streets.

Geography 
Utyakovo is located 23 km south of Krasnousolsky (the district's administrative centre) by road. Yangi-Yurt is the nearest rural locality.

References 

Rural localities in Gafuriysky District